Taste of Salt: A Story of Modern Haiti is a young adult novel written by Frances Temple, and published in 1992.  It is set in Haiti, and although most of the characters and events are fictional, the background is real and Jean-Bertrand Aristide is a real person. The story tells about a young boy, Djo, who is injured in a hospital bombing by the street gangsters, or Macoutes. This book is not just about political events in Haiti; it also has many parts about discovering hope, faith, and trust.

The story starts with Djo in the hospital. Jeremie has been sent by Titid (Aristide) to tape Djo as he tells his life story. Djo talks about his life from the beginning since he was a child. The story continues with his various jobs, the poverty in Haiti, how Djo had to work as a slave.

The second part of the story has to do with Jeremie. Jeremie is a girl who has been educated in a nun school. She always wanted to work her way out of the slums of Haiti and live somewhere else. After she meets Djo and listens to his story, she realizes she must stay in Haiti and try to make Haiti a better place.

The third part returns to Djo's story.  Djo continues from where he left off at part one and talks about his life leading up to being hospitalized.  This includes how he escaped from slavery, and his escapades with Titid leading up to the firebombing.

1992 American novels
Haitian literature
Novels set in Haiti
American young adult novels